Woodland Township is one of twelve townships in Carroll County, Illinois, USA.  As of the 2020 census, its population was 292 and it contained 157 housing units.

Geography

Unincorporated towns
 Polsgrove
(This list is based on USGS data and may include former settlements.)

Cemeteries
The township contains these two cemeteries: Woodland Brethren and Zion.

Major highways
  Illinois Route 78

Demographics
As of the 2020 census there were 292 people, 149 households, and 91 families residing in the township. The racial makeup of the township was 96.58% White, 0.34% African American, 0.00% Native American, 0.00% Asian, 0.34% Pacific Islander, 0.00% from other races, and 2.74% from two or more races. Hispanic or Latino of any race were 1.37% of the population.

There were 149 households, out of which 0.00% had children under the age of 18 living with them, 61.07% were married couples living together, 0.00% had a female householder with no spouse present, and 38.93% were non-families. 38.90% of all households were made up of individuals, and 8.70% had someone living alone who was 65 years of age or older. The average household size was 1.62 and the average family size was 2.01.

The township's age distribution consisted of 0.0% under the age of 18, 4.1% from 18 to 24, 0.4% from 25 to 44, 32.8% from 45 to 64, and 62.7% who were 65 years of age or older. The median age was 66.2 years. For every 100 females, there were 151.0 males. For every 100 females age 18 and over, there were 151.0 males.

The median income for a household in the township was $59,063, and the median income for a family was $67,938. Males had a median income of $52,031 versus $6,688 for females. The per capita income for the township was $41,465.

School districts
 West Carroll Community Unit School District 314

Political districts
 Illinois' 16th congressional district
 State House District 71
 State Senate District 36

References
 
 United States Census Bureau 2007 TIGER/Line Shapefiles
 United States National Atlas

External links
 City-Data.com
 Illinois State Archives
 Carroll County official site

Townships in Carroll County, Illinois
Townships in Illinois